Georgia participated in the Junior Eurovision Song Contest 2008 which took place on 22 November 2008, in Lemesos, Cyprus. Georgian Public Broadcaster (GPB) was responsible for organising their entry for the contest. Group Bzikebi was externally selected to represent Georgia with the song "Bzz..". Georgia won the contest with 154 points.

Background

Before Junior Eurovision

National final
Georgia selected their Junior Eurovision entry for 2008 using a national selection consisting of 9 songs. The winner was trio Bzikebi, with the song "Bzz..".

Artist and song information

Bzikebi

The winning contestants, Bzikebi ("wasps"), are a trio from Tbilisi. managed by Georgian composer Giga Kukhiadnidze. The group consists of Giorgi Shiolashvili (born), Mariam Kikuashvili (born), and Mariam Tatulashvili (born), who were all ten years old during the contest. 

Bzikebi won the Junior Eurovision Song Contest 2008 in Lemesos, Cyprus on 22 November 2008 with their song "Bzz..". During their performance they were dressed in outfits with black and yellow stripes resembling bees and they sang in a made-up language. They won the competition with a total of 154 points.

At Junior Eurovision
During the running order draw which took place on 14 October 2008, Georgia was drawn to perform sixth on 22 November 2008, following Greece and preceding Belgium.

Final
During the final, Bzikebi performed downstage in outfits combining both yellow and black, resembling bees. Bzikebi won the Junior Eurovision Song Contest 2008, receiving 154 points for their song "Bzz..".

Voting

Notes

References

External links 
 Official Georgian JESC Site
 (review)

Junior Eurovision Song Contest
Georgia
2008